Zeni is a surname. Notable people with the surname include:

 Alberto Zeni (born 1980), Mexican actor
 Luisa Zeni (1896–1940), Italian secret agent and writer
 Marco Zeni, Italian journalist

See also 

 Zeni (disambiguation)
 Zeno (surname)